This is a list of episodes of the eleventh season of The Ellen DeGeneres Show, which aired from September 2014 to June 2015.

Episodes
{{Episode table
| background  = 373829
| total_width = 73
| overall     = 5
| season      = 6
| airdate     = 14
| viewers     = 38
| aux4        = 10
| aux4T       = U.S. viewers(millions)
| viewersT    = Guests
| episodes    =

References

External links
 

12
2014 American television seasons
2015 American television seasons